John L. Ostrander (July 15, 1908 – June 29, 1988) was an American politician who served in the New York State Assembly from the Saratoga district from 1946 to 1962.

References

1908 births
1988 deaths
Republican Party members of the New York State Assembly
20th-century American politicians